Doryichthys contiguus (pygmy pipefish) is a species of freshwater fish of the family Syngnathidae. It is found in the lower Mekong basin in Lao PDR, Thailand, and Cambodia. This species is ovoviviparous, with males carrying eggs before giving birth to live young. Its body is a dark brown.

References

Further reading

Fishes of Mainland Southeast Asia

contiguus
Marine fish
Fish described in 2000